101 Dalmatians is a 1996 American adventure comedy film, which is a live action adaptation of Walt Disney’s 1961 animated film of almost the same name, itself an adaptation of Dodie Smith's 1956 novel The Hundred and One Dalmatians. Directed by Stephen Herek and co-produced by John Hughes (who also wrote the script) and Ricardo Mestres, it stars Glenn Close,  Jeff Daniels, Joely Richardson and Joan Plowright. Unlike the 1961 animated film, none of the animals speak.

101 Dalmatians was released on November 27, 1996. It grossed $320 million in theaters against a $67 million budget, making it the sixth highest-grossing film of 1996. Close was nominated for the Golden Globe Award for Best Actress – Motion Picture Musical or Comedy, while the film was nominated for a BAFTA Award for Best Makeup and Hair. A sequel, 102 Dalmatians, was released on November 22, 2000, with Glenn Close and Tim McInnerny reprising their roles while a reboot, Cruella, directed by Craig Gillespie was released on May 28, 2021.

Plot

American video game designer Roger Dearly lives with his pet Dalmatian Pongo in London. One day, Pongo sets his eyes on a female Dalmatian named Perdita. After a frantic chase through the streets of London that ends in St James's Park, Roger discovers that Pongo likes Perdita. Her owner, Anita Campbell-Green falls in love with Roger when they meet. They both fall into the lake as a result of their dogs chasing each other, but they return to Roger's home and Anita accepts his proposal. They get married along with Perdita and Pongo. Anita works as a fashion designer at the House of de Vil. Her boss, the diabolical, yet glamorous Cruella de Vil, has a deep passion for fur, going so far as to have a taxidermist, Mr. Skinner, skin a female white tiger named Sue-Ling at the London Zoo to make her into a rug for her. Anita, inspired by her Dalmatian, designs a coat made with spotted fur. Cruella is intrigued by the idea of making garments out of actual Dalmatians, and finds it amusing that it would seem as if she was wearing Anita's dog.

Anita soon discovers that Perdita is pregnant and is then informed that she, herself, is too, much to her shock. Sometime later, Cruella visits their home and expresses contempt upon meeting Roger. Her initial disgust at them having a baby turns to excitement when she finds out Perdita is expecting too. Several weeks later, she returns when a litter of 15 puppies are born and offers Roger and Anita £7,500 for them, but they refuse. Enraged, Cruella dismisses Anita and vows revenge against her and Roger. One winter evening, she has her henchmen, Jasper and Horace, break into their home and steal the puppies, while Roger and Anita are walking in the park with Pongo and Perdita. Along with 84 other Dalmatians that were previously stolen, they deliver them to her ancient country estate, De Vil Mansion. Cruella also asks Skinner to kill and skin them to create her coat.

With the family devastated at the loss of their puppies, Pongo uses the twilight bark to carry the message via the dogs and other animals of Great Britain, while Roger and Anita notify the Metropolitan Police. Anita realizes Cruella was behind the kidnapping of the puppies. She confirms her suspicion when she shows Roger her portfolio.  An Airedale Terrier follows Jasper and Horace to the mansion, and finds all of them inside, before helping them escape under the duo's noses. They make their way to a nearby farm, where they are later joined by Pongo and Perdita. Cruella arrives at the mansion and soon discovers what has happened. Angry with the thieves' failure, she decides to carry out the job herself. After several mishaps, Jasper and Horace discover nearby police looking for Cruella and hand themselves in.

Cruella tracks the puppies to the farm where they are hiding and tries to kill them. The farm animals carry out a plan to take down Cruella while the puppies escape. They steal her hat, drop a pig on her, cause her to fall into a vat of molasses and finally get flung into a pigpen, defeating her. The police arrive just in time to arrest a now filthy Cruella who is taken into custody along with Jasper, Horace and Skinner. As she berates them for their failures as well as the downfall of her business and reputation, they are all sprayed by the skunk that snuck into her car before she went to the farm.

All of the fleeing dalmatians are found and sent home via the Suffolk Constabulary. Pongo, Perdita and their puppies are reunited with Roger, Anita and Nanny. After being informed that the remaining 84 puppies have no home to go to, as they have not yet been claimed by their original owners, they decide to adopt them. Roger designs a successful video game featuring dalmatian puppies as the protagonists and Cruella as the villain, with this success they move out of London to the countryside with their millions. Roger and Anita have a baby girl, and a year later the puppies have grown up with puppies of their own.

Cast
 Glenn Close as Cruella de Vil
 Jeff Daniels as Roger Dearly
 Joely Richardson as Anita Campbell-Green-Dearly
 Joan Plowright as Nanny
 Hugh Laurie as Jasper
 Mark Williams as Horace
 John Shrapnel as Mr. Skinner
 Tim McInnerny as Alonzo
 Hugh Fraser as Frederick
 Zohren Weiss as Herbert
 Brian Capron as Television News Reporter
 Frank Welker as Pongo and Perdita (creature sounds)

Production 
The animatronic creatures used in the film are provided by Jim Henson's Creature Shop. Producer Edward S. Feldman guaranteed the adoption of every puppy used in the film. Over 300 Dalmatian puppies were used over the course of filming, because "we could only use them when they were 5 or 6 weeks old and at their cutest." Filming took place at Shepperton Studios in London.

John Hughes, who wrote the film's screenplay, approached Glenn Close for the role of Cruella de Vil, but she initially turned it down. The film's costume designer Anthony Powell, who was working with Close on the Broadway show Sunset Boulevard, then convinced her to take it.

Minster Court was used as the exterior of Cruella de Vil's fashion house. Sarum Chase was used as the exterior of her home. Cruella's car is a modified 1976 Panther De Ville.

Release

Box office
101 Dalmatians was released in the United States on November 27, 1996. The UK premiere of the film was held on December 4, 1996, at the Royal Albert Hall, London, and the exterior of the Hall was lit with dalmatian spots.
It grossed $136.2 million in North America and $320.7 million worldwide.

Home media
101 Dalmatians was released on VHS for the first time on April 15, 1997, Laserdisc in early 1997, and on DVD on April 21, 1998. It was re-released on September 16, 2008.

Video game
 An Handheld LCD Game based on the film was released in 1996 by Tiger Electronics.
 The 1997 Disney's Animated Storybook (CD-ROM for PC) adaptation uses elements of this film, along with the original animated movie.
 A video game based on the film entitled 101 Dalmatians: Escape from DeVil Manor was released in May 1997.

Reception
On Rotten Tomatoes, 101 Dalmatians has an approval rating of 41% and an average rating of 5.32/10, based on 37 reviews. The site's critic consensus reads: "Neat performance from Glenn Close aside, 101 Dalmatians is a bland, pointless remake." On Metacritic the film has a weighted average score of 49 out of 100, based on 20 critics, indicating "mixed or average reviews". Audiences surveyed by CinemaScore gave the film an average grade of "A" on an A+ to F scale.

Controversy
Animal rights organizations protested the film's release, saying that Dalmatian sales shot up after the premiere, fueled by impulsive purchases of puppies by parents for their children. Being ill-prepared to care for a relatively difficult breed of dog past puppy-hood, many of these new owners eventually surrendered their animals to pounds, where many dogs ended up being euthanized.

Sequel and reboot

A sequel, 102 Dalmatians, was released on November 22, 2000. Glenn Close returned in her role. The film's early working title was 101 Dalmatians Returns.

Disney planned a live-action Cruella de Vil reboot film on the title character's origins titled Cruella. Glenn Close acted as an executive producer. Emma Stone played the title role. The film was released on May 28, 2021.

References

External links

 
 
 
 
 
 101 Dalmatians at Box Office Mojo

101 Dalmatians films
1996 films
1996 comedy films
1990s children's adventure films
1990s children's comedy films
American children's adventure films
American children's comedy films
American films with live action and animation
Remakes of American films
Live-action films based on Disney's animated films
1990s English-language films
Films about dogs
Films about pets
Films about kidnapping in the United Kingdom
Films based on adaptations
Films based on children's books
Films directed by Stephen Herek
Films produced by John Hughes (filmmaker)
Films scored by Michael Kamen
Films set in London
Films set in Suffolk
Films shot at Shepperton Studios
Films shot in London
Films with screenplays by John Hughes (filmmaker)
Walt Disney Pictures films
1990s American films